"People Make the World Go Round" is a song written by Thom Bell and Linda Creed, originally recorded by The Stylistics and released in 1972 through Avco Records as the final single from their self-titled debut studio album, The Stylistics (1971). It reached #25 on the Billboard Hot 100 singles chart, #25 on the Adult Contemporary chart, and #6 on the Soul Singles chart in the United States.

Track listing

Charts

Marc Dorsey version

American R&B artist Marc Dorsey recorded his take on the song specifically for Spike Lee's 1994 film Crooklyn - A Spike Lee Joint!. It was produced by Narada Michael Walden and released as a promotional single on May 10, 1994 through MCA Records. It peaked at #65 on the Hot R&B/Hip-Hop Songs and at #66 on the R&B/Hip-Hop Airplay in the United States. Both  the Stylistics' and Marc Dorsey's versions were featured in the film, as well as in its soundtrack.

Track listing

Charts

Richard Elliot version

Scottish-born American saxophonist Richard Elliot recorded a smooth jazz rendition which was featured in his 2005 studio album Metro Blue, released via ARTizen Music Group. Produced by Elliot and Rick Braun, the song made it to #5 on the Smooth Jazz Songs chart in the United States.

Charts

Sampled credits
The song was sampled by several hip hop recording artists, including: 

 Naughty by Nature in "World Go Round" from Poverty's Paradise (1995)
 Westside Connection in "Gangstas Make the World Go Round" from Bow Down (1996) 
 Scarface in "Money Makes the World Go 'Round" from The Untouchable (1997) 
 Rick Ross in "I Think She Like Me" from Rather You Than Me (2017)

References

External links 
 
 

1971 songs
1972 singles
Avco Records singles
The Stylistics songs
Songs written by Thom Bell
Songs written by Linda Creed
Michael Jackson songs
Ramsey Lewis songs